Arvo Iho (born 21 June 1949) is an Estonian film director, cinematographer, actor and photographer, who has worked in the areas of documentary and drama.

Career
Born in Rakvere, Iho worked as a photographer and assistant for Tallinnfilm before studying cinematography at the Gerasimov Institute of Cinematography. Iho acted as assistant director to Andrei Tarkovsky on the 1979 film Stalker. He went on to work as a cameraman for Tallinnfilm in the 1980s.

In 1985, Iho co-directed the feature film Games for School–Age Children with Leida Laius, also acting as director of cinematography, and in 1987 made his solo directorial debut with The Birdwatcher, about the relationship between a poacher and an ornithologist. He followed this with Only for the Insane (1990). In 2001 he made The Heart of the Bear, based on the Nikolai Baturin novel, and in 2006 made Gooseberries.

As a photographer, Iho has exhibited nationally and internationally.

As of 2017, Iho was a professor at Tallinn University's Baltic Film and Media School.

Filmography as director
Mitme Kandiga Õun (Skulptor Ülo Õun) (1984)
29 Minutes with Ülo Õun (1984)
Games for School-Age Children (1985)
Tülitaja (1986)
The Birdwatcher (1987)
Milarepa Laulud (1989)
For Crazies Only (1990)
Sireniki Kroonika (1991)
Impeeriumi Lapsed (1993)
Jaanipäev Ingerimaal (1995)
The Heart of the Bear (2001)
Marina Kuvaitseva and the Lonely Women (2004)
Children of the Singing Revolution (2004)

Awards
National Union Prize for the Best Youth Film, 1987, for Games for School-Age Children
UNICEF Award, Berlin International Film Festival, 1987 (with Leida Laius), for Naerata ometi
Jury Special Prize, Torino International Festival of Young Cinema, 1988, for The Birdwatcher
FIPRESCI prize for best debut film, Karlovy Vary International Film Festival (Czech Republic), 1988, for The Birdwatcher
Grand Jury Prize, Rouen Nordic Film Festival, 1990, for The Birdwatcher
Grand Prize & Catholic Film Critics Award, Mannheim-Heidelberg International Filmfestival, 1992, for Ainult hulludele ehk halastajaõde
Order of the White Star, V Class, 2001.

References

External links
Arvo Iho at EFIS

1949 births
Living people
Estonian film directors
Estonian cinematographers
Estonian film producers
Estonian male film actors
People from Rakvere
Recipients of the Order of the White Star, 5th Class